The Odjak of Algiers was a unit of the Algerine army. It was a heavily autonomous part of the Janissary Corps, acting completely independently from the rest of the corps, similar to the relationship between Algiers and the Sublime Porte. Led by an Agha, they also took part in the country's internal administration, and politics, ruling the country for several years. They acted as a defense unit, a Praetorian Guard, and an instrument of repression until 1817.

Ethnic composition

From the Ottoman Empire 
The majority of the unit during the 16th to 18th century were composed of "Turks". These "Turks" were not strictly, or mainly Turkish. They included Albanians, Greeks, Serbs, Kurds, Armenians etc. They were recruited in the Ottoman Empire, or in some cases they were recruited from immigrants. After the 18th century most Janissaries from the Ottoman Empire were mercenaries.

Kouloughlis 
Kouloughlis were people of mixed Algerian-Non Algerian origins. In 1629 the Kouloughlis allied with many other local tribes attempted to drive out the Odjak and the janissaries. They failed, and were expelled. In 1674, they were allowed to join the corps, but only 1st generation kouloughlis (direct sons of Turks). In 1694, this was laxed, and all Kouloughlis were allowed to join the odjak. By the 18th and 19th century the Kouloughlis were the majority in the corps.

Algerian Moors and Arabs 
Despite initially not being allowed to join the army, as time passed, and relations became more and more distant between the Ottoman Empire and the Regency, importation of troops became more and more problematic. Initially, some locals were allowed to join the odjak as garrison Auxiliaries. This became more and more common, but only in isolated areas. As many Between 1699 and 1701, out of 40 cases of janissaries whose origins are mentioned, 5 had been recruited among the Algerians, but these were in mostly rural areas. In reality, the corps was still overwhelmingly Turkish. After a coup by Ali Chauch the Odjak was weakened, and the Dey-Pacha had far more authority than before. He weakened the janissaries, and forced them to lax their procedures. As time passed, these procedures were more and more lax. As the Odjak was the main force outside of the unreliable Arab-Berber tribal levy whom were in a lot of cases regarded as unloyal, it was important not to recruit people who would have tribal loyalties. Thus many Algerian orphans and criminals were recruited into the Odjak. By 1803 every 17th janissary was of Algerian origins.

By 1828 out of the total 14,000 Ujaq janissaries, 2,000 were Algerians meaning that every 7th Janissary was of fully Algerian origins.

Renegades 
Renegades were also allowed into the corps, although their exact number isn't known and was probably low.

Turmoil in 1817 
After a period of stagnation, and military defeat Algiers was severely weakened. After losing the Barbary Wars, and the Bombardment of Algiers, the Odjak sprung into action and killed the ruling dey, Omar Agha. In 1817 Ali Khodja couped the country following a decisive defeat. The Turk janissaries attempted a coup, against whom Ali Khodja raised the Kouloughli Janissaries, and allied berber tribes such as the Igawawen. The Turks were defeated and slaughtered while the rest were sent back to the Ottoman provinces.

References 

Military history of Algeria
Ottoman Army
Ottoman Algeria
Janissaries